Marriage à-la-mode may refer to:

 Marriage à la mode (play), a 1673 Restoration comedy by John Dryden
 "Marriage à-la-mode" (Hogarth), a series of 18th-century paintings by William Hogarth
 "Marriage à la Mode" (short story), a 1921 short story by Katherine Mansfield